Adoxophyes fasciata is a species of moth of the family Tortricidae. It is found in Japan (Honshu, Hokkaido), Taiwan and China.

The length of the forewings is 7–9 mm for males and 9–11.5 mm for females. The forewings are dull cinnamon-brown in females and yellowish brown in males.

The larvae are polyphagous and a pest on various fruit crops, including Malus species. They cause damage to foliage, blossoms and fruits.

References

Moths described in 1900
Adoxophyes
Moths of Asia